Høgafjellet is a mountain on the island of Osterøy in Vestland county, Norway.

See also
List of mountains of Norway

References

Osterøy
Vaksdal
Mountains of Vestland